The 2023 Austin FC season is the club's third season in Major League Soccer, the top flight of soccer in the United States. They play in the league's Western Conference and finished as Western runners-up to Los Angeles FC in the 2022 regular season standings.

Austin will participate in two new competitions for the first time, their first regional (the 2023 Leagues Cup) and continental competition (the 2023 CONCACAF Champions League).

Background 

Austin FC started playing in the MLS Western Conference in 2021, finishing in 12th place with a record of 9W-4D-21L. 2022 brought many new experiences to Austin FC. They lost their first ever U.S. Open Cup match against San Antonio FC in extra time, won their first trophy, the Copa Tejas, and qualified for their first-ever MLS Cup Playoffs in just their second season as a franchise. Austin FC advanced to the Western Conference Finals but lost to LAFC. They qualified for the 2023 CONCACAF Champions League as a result of their success in 2022.

Summary

Pre-season 
Immediately following the 2022 season, Austin FC started their preparation for the 2023 MLS Season. On November 7, 2022, Austin FC announced multiple roster decision influencing the 2023 season. Jared Stroud was traded to St. Louis City SC, Hector Jiménez's contract is being allowed to expire, Washington Corozo's transfer option was not exercised, and options were declined on Danny Hoesen, Felipe Martins, Freddy Kleemann, Andrew Tarbell, and Will Pulisic.

Austin FC continued shaping their 2023 team during the 2022 MLS Re-Entry Draft, when they traded with DC United for the first selection in that draft for $50,000 general allocation money. With the first selection Austin FC chose midfielder Sofiane Djeffal from DC United. On the same day, Austin FC announced that they selected Forward Alfonso Ocampo-Chavez from the End-of-Year Waiver list from the Seattle Sounders, where he had spent time with the MLS Next Pro club Tacoma Defiance. On November 29, 2022, Austin FC and Ocampo-Chavez came to terms on a one-year guarantee through the 2023 season, with a two-year team option through 2025.

In December Austin FC continued to work on their 2023 roster  announcing on December 8, 2022 they had resigned Hector Jiménez  and announced on December 12, 2022 that hey had acquired Gyasi Zardes through free agency. The 2023 MLS SuperDraft was held on December 21, 2022 and Austin FC picked up CJ Fodrey (GA) and Valentin Noel in the first round, Jackson Walti in the second round, and Salvatore Mazzaferro in the third round.

Austin FC started the new year by strengthening their goalkeeping corps, adding Matt Bersano from the free agent list. Austin FC strengthened their defensive unit on January 4, 2023 by acquiring Leo Väisänen from IF Elfsborg. One day after signing Väisänen, Austin FC announced that Ruben Gabrielsen will be leaving the team after just one year and moving to Lillestrøm SK Continuing to shape the team for 2023 season, Austin FC announced on 6 January 2023 that they had come to an agreement to transfer Tomás Pochettino to Brazilian side Fortaleza Esporte Clube. Adding more depth to their defensive formation, Austin FC announced on January 10, 2023 they had signed Adam Lundqvist from their cross-state rival Houston Dynamo for $500,000 GAM over the 2023-2024 seasons. Looking to build their defense for the longest MLS season to date, Austin FC announced they had signed Amro Tarek as a free agent on January 27, 2023. On January 31, 2023, Austin FC announced Moussa Djitté had been loaned to AC Ajaccio on a short term loan through the end of the Ligue 1 season, with an option to purchase at the end of the season. After a trial period for a Veteran striker, Austin FC announced on February 10, 2023 that they had signed Will Bruin to a one year contract, with an option for a second year. The club extended Sebastian Driussi for three years with a fourth-year option on February 14 and named him the next captain.  Days before the first match of the season Austin FC extended Diego Fagúndez for three years with a fourth year option, finalizing preseason moves for the team

February/March
Austin FC started the 2023 season with a 3-2 loss to St. Louis City SC in their first ever match. Julio Cascante was subbed off in the 11th minute after suffering an adductor strain injury. Austin rebounded with a 1-0 win over CF Montreal where Maximiliano Urruti scored the game-winner the 88th minute. Austin returned to MLS competition against Real Salt Lake and won their second game of the year with a 2-1 win in Utah. Owen Wolff scored his first professional goal and the match-winner in the 33rd minute. Austin FC suffered their first road loss of the season in a 2–0 defeat to their cross-state rivals Houston Dynamo FC.

Continuing their longest season to date, Austin FC travelled to the Dominican Republic to take on the Haitian side Violette AC for their first CONCACAF Champions League game, losing 3-0 on March 7. On March 14, 2023, Austin FC faced Violette AC in the return fixture at Q2 Stadium. Though Austin FC won the game 2–0, they fell in the series on an aggregate score of 3–2, ending their 2023 CONCACAF Champions League run.

Management team

Roster

.

Transfers

In

Loan In

Out

Loan out

MLS SuperDraft picks

Non-competitive fixtures

Preseason

Competitive fixtures

Major League Soccer Regular Season

Standings

Western Conference

Overall

Matches

MLS Playoffs

CONCACAF Champions League

Leagues Cup

South 1

U.S. Open Cup

Statistics

Appearances and goals

Numbers after plus–sign (+) denote appearances as a substitute.

Top scorers
{| class="wikitable" style="font-size: 95%; text-align: center;"
|-
!width=30|Rank
!width=30|Position
!width=30|Number
!width=175|Name
!width=75|
!width=75|
!width=75|
!width=75|Continental
!width=75|Total
|-
|1
|MF
|10
|align="left"| Sebastián Driussi
|1
|0
|0
|2
|3
|-
|2
|DF
|17
|align="left"| Jon Gallagher
|2
|0
|0
|0
|2
|-
|rowspan=2|3
|MF
|33
|align="left"| Owen Wolff
|1
|0
|0
|0
|rowspan=2|1
|-
|FW
|37
|align="left"| Maximiliano Urruti
|1
|0
|0
|0
|-
!colspan="4"|Total
! 5
! 0
! 0
! 2
! 7

Top assists
{| class="wikitable" style="font-size: 95%; text-align: center;"
|-
!width=30|Rank
!width=30|Position
!width=30|Number
!width=175|Name
!width=75|
!width=75|
!width=75|
!width=75|Continental
!width=75|Total
|-
|rowspan=8|1
|MF
|6
|align="left"| Daniel Pereira
|1
|0
|0
|0
|rowspan=8|1
|-
|MF
|7
|align="left"|Emiliano Rigoni
|0
|0
|0
|1
|-
|MF
|8
|align="left"|Alexander Ring
|0
|0
|0
|1
|-
|MF
|14
|align="left"|Diego Fagúndez
|1
|0
|0
|0
|-
|DF
|15
|align="left"| Leo Väisänen
|1
|0
|0
|0
|-
|DF
|17
|align="left"| Jon Gallagher
|1
|0
|0
|0
|-
|DF
|24
|align="left"| Nick Lima
|1
|0
|0
|0
|-
|MF
|33
|align="left"| Owen Wolff
|1
|0
|0
|0
|-
!colspan="4"|Total
!6
!0
!0
!0
!6

Disciplinary record
{| class="wikitable" style="text-align:center;"
|-
| rowspan="2" !width=15|
| rowspan="2" !width=15|
| rowspan="2" !width=120|Player
| colspan="3"|MLS
| colspan="3"|National Cup
| colspan="3"|Continental
| colspan="3"|Total
|-
!width=34; background:#fe9;|
!width=34; background:#fe9;|
!width=34; background:#ff8888;|
!width=34; background:#fe9;|
!width=34; background:#fe9;|
!width=34; background:#ff8888;|
!width=34; background:#fe9;|
!width=34; background:#fe9;|
!width=34; background:#ff8888;|
!width=34; background:#fe9;|
!width=34; background:#fe9;|
!width=34; background:#ff8888;|
|-
|1
|GK
|align="left"| Brad Stuver
|0||0||0||0||0||0||0||0||0||0||0||0
|-
|3
|DF
|align="left"| Amro Tarek
|0||0||0||0||0||0||0||0||0||0||0||0
|-
|4
|CB
|align="left"| Kipp Keller
|0||0||0||0||0||0||0||0||0||0||0||0
|-
|5
|MF
|align="left"| Jhojan Valencia
|0||0||0||0||0||0||1||0||0||1||0||0
|-
|6
|MF
|align="left"| Daniel Pereira
|0||0||0||0||0||0||0||0||0||0||0||0
|-
|7
|FW
|align="left"| Emiliano Rigoni
|0||0||0||0||0||0||1||0||0||1||0||0
|-
|8
|MF
|align="left"| Alexander Ring
|0||0||0||0||0||0||0||0||0||0||0||0
|-
|9
|FW
|align="left"| Gyasi Zardes
|0||0||0||0||0||0||0||0||0||0||0||0
|-
|10
|MF
|align="left"| Sebastián Driussi
|0||0||0||0||0||0||0||0||0||0||0||0
|-
|11
|FW
|align="left"| Rodney Redes
|0||0||0||0||0||0||0||0||0||0||0||0
|-
|12
|GK
|align="left"| Damian Las
|0||0||0||0||0||0||0||0||0||0||0||0
|-
|13
|MF
|align="left"| Ethan Finlay
|0||0||0||0||0||0||0||0||0||0||0||0
|-
|14
|MF
|align="left"| Diego Fagúndez
|1||0||0||0||0||0||0||0||0||0||0||0
|-
|15
|DF
|align="left"| Leo Väisänen
|1||0||0||0||0||0||0||0||0||0||0||0
|-
|16
|CB
|align="left"| Hector Jiménez
|0||0||0||0||0||0||0||0||0||0||0||0
|-
|17
|DF
|align="left"| Jon Gallagher
|0||0||0||0||0||0||0||0||0||0||0||0
|-
|18
|CB
|align="left"| Julio Cascante
|0||0||0||0||0||0||0||0||0||0||0||0
|-
|19
|MF
|align="left"| CJ Fodrey
|0||0||0||0||0||0||0||0||0||0||0||0
|-
|20
|GK
|align="left"| Matt Bersano
|0||0||0||0||0||0||0||0||0||0||0||0
|-
|21
|LB
|align="left"| Adam Lundqvist
|1||0||0||0||0||0||0||0||0||0||0||0
|-
|22
|MF
|align="left"| Sofiane Djeffal
|0||0||0||0||0||0||1||0||0||1||0||0
|-
|23
|LB
|align="left"| Žan Kolmanič
|0||0||0||0||0||0||0||0||0||0||0||0
|-
|24
|RB
|align="left"| Nick Lima
|0||0||0||0||0||0||0||0||0||0||0||0
|-
|26
|RB
|align="left"| Charlie Asensio
|0||0||0||0||0||0||0||0||0||0||0||0
|-
|28
|FW
|align="left"| Alfonso Ocampo-Chavez
|0||0||0||0||0||0||0||0||0||0||0||0
|-
|33
|MF
|align="left"| Owen Wolff
|0||0||0||0||0||0||0||0||0||0||0||0
|-
|37
|FW
|align="left"| Maximiliano Urruti
|0||0||0||0||0||0||0||0||0||0||0||0
|-
!colspan="3"|Total||3||0||0||0||0||0||3||0||0||3||0||0

Awards and Honors

CONCACAF Champions League Bext XI

MLS Team of the Matchday

MLS Goal of the Matchday

Notes

References 

 

2023
Austin FC
Austin FC
Austin FC
Austin FC